Capital punishment in Washington may refer to:

 Capital punishment in Washington (state)
 Capital punishment in Washington, D.C.